Al-Hashamah is a sub-district located in the At-Ta'iziyah District, Taiz Governorate, Yemen. Al-Hashamah had a population of 14,246 according to the 2004 census.

References  

Sub-districts in At-Ta'iziyah District